Darcy Michael is a Canadian actor and stand-up comedian, best known for his stand up comedy, his viral tiktok account @thedarcymichael and his role in the Canadian television sitcom Spun Out.

Career
Nominated for a Canadian Comedy Award in 2010 for his appearance at the Winnipeg Comedy Festival, he filmed his own half-hour special for The Comedy Network series Comedy Now! the same year. His career as a comedian significantly took off with his 2012 comedy special One Skinny Bitch, which was released as a direct download and in DVD format. The special, taped at Yuk Yuk's in Toronto, Ontario, centred in part on his experience losing over 120 pounds after a health scare. Around the same time, he also filmed several episodes of a proposed talk show, The Skinny, interviewing guests including Alan Thicke, Caroline Rhea, Judy Gold, David Steinberg and Harland Williams.

In 2014, he was a finalist in Sirius XM Canada's Top Comic competition, and received a second Canadian Comedy Award nomination as Best Breakout Artist.

He has also performed at the Halifax Comedy Festival, Just for Laughs, Calgary Pride, Vancouver Pride and Toronto Pride, appears frequently on the CBC Radio One comedy series The Debaters and the Comedy Network edition of Match Game, and has had several stage roles in theatre productions in Vancouver.

In 2016 he released his album Family Highs, which debuted at number 1 on iTunes, Google Play and Amazon.

In 2018, he was the first comedian to release a 60-minute stand up special on CraveTV. Produced by Just for Laughs the special Darcy Michael Goes to Church was called "the queer stand up special you've been waiting for" by Now Magazine.

In 2021 Darcy launched a TikTok account with his husband Jeremy that has quickly grown to over 2 Million followers and over 30 million likes. Around the same time he launched a podcast with comedian Jane Stanton called High School Sucked that has consistently charted in the top 100 comedy podcasts worldwide. In April 2021, Buzzfeed said "If you're not listening to High School Sucked, you're missing out."

Personal life
Originally from Pickering, Ontario, Darcy grew up in North Vancouver where he graduated from Argyle Secondary School. He is currently based in Ladner, British Columbia. Openly gay, he lives with his husband of 18 years Jeremy Baer and their daughter.

Filmography

Film

Television

References

External links

Canadian male film actors
Canadian male television actors
Canadian male stage actors
Canadian stand-up comedians
Gay comedians
Canadian gay actors
Male actors from British Columbia
People from Pickering, Ontario
People from Delta, British Columbia
Living people
Year of birth missing (living people)
21st-century Canadian male actors
21st-century Canadian comedians
Canadian male comedians
21st-century Canadian LGBT people
Canadian LGBT comedians